The Reich Chancellery was the traditional name of the office of the Chancellor of Germany (then called Reichskanzler) in the period of the German Reich from 1878 to 1945. The Chancellery's seat, selected and prepared since 1875, was the former city palace of Prince Antoni Radziwiłł (1775–1833) on Wilhelmstraße in Berlin. Both the palace and a new Reich Chancellery building (completed in early 1939) were seriously damaged during World War II and subsequently demolished.

Today the office of the German chancellor is usually called Kanzleramt (Chancellor's Office), or more formally Bundeskanzleramt (Federal Chancellor's Office). The latter is also the name of the new seat of the Chancellor's Office, completed in 2001.

Old Reich Chancellery 
When the military alliance of the North German Confederation was reorganised as a federal state with effect from July 1, 1867, the office of a Federal Chancellor (Bundeskanzler) was implemented at Berlin and staffed with the Prussian Prime Minister Otto von Bismarck. After the unification of Germany on January 18, 1871, by accession of the South German states, Bismarck became Reich Chancellor of the new German Empire.

In 1869, the Prussian state government had acquired the Rococo city palace of late Prince Radziwiłł on Wilhelmstraße No. 77 (former "Palais Schulenburg"), which from 1875 was refurbished as the official building of the Chancellery. It was inaugurated with the meetings of the Berlin Congress in July 1878, followed by the Congo Conference in 1884.

In the days of the Weimar Republic the Chancellery was significantly enlarged by the construction of a Modern southern annex finished in 1930. In 1932/33, while his nearby office on Wilhelmstraße No. 73 was renovated, the building also served as the residence of Reich President Paul von Hindenburg, where he appointed Adolf Hitler chancellor on 30 January 1933. The Hitler Cabinet held few meetings here. In 1935, the architects Paul Troost and Leonhard Gall redesigned the interior as Hitler's domicile. They also added a large reception hall/ballroom and conservatory, officially known as the Festsaal mit Wintergarten in the garden area. The latter addition was unique because of the large cellar that led a further one-and-a-half meters down to an air-raid shelter known as the Vorbunker. Once completed in 1936, it was officially called the "Reich Chancellery Air-Raid Shelter" until 1943, with the construction to expand the bunker complex with the addition of the Führerbunker, located one level below. The two bunkers were connected by a stairway set at right angles which could be closed off from each other.

Devastated by air raids and almost completely destroyed during the Battle of Berlin, the ruins of the Old Reich Chancellery were not cleared until 1950.

New Reich Chancellery

In late January 1938, Adolf Hitler officially assigned his favourite architect, Albert Speer, to build the New Reich Chancellery around the corner on Voßstraße, a western branch-off of Wilhelmstraße, requesting that the building be completed within a year. Hitler commented that Bismarck's Old Chancellery was "fit for a soap company" and not suitable as headquarters of a Greater German Reich. It nevertheless remained his official residence, where Hitler lived in the so-called Führerwohnung ("Leader apartment"). The Old and New Chancellery shared a large garden area, with the underground Führerbunker, where Hitler ultimately committed suicide at the end of April 1945.

Hitler placed the entire northern side of the Voßstraße at Speer's disposal, assigning him the work of creating grand halls and salons which "will make an impression on people". Speer was given a blank cheque — Hitler stated that the cost of the project was immaterial — and was instructed that the building be of solid construction, and that it be finished by the following January in time for the next New Year's diplomatic reception to be held in the new building.

Speer claimed in his autobiography that he had completed the task of clearing the site, designing, constructing, and furnishing the building in less than a year. In fact, preliminary planning and versions of the designs were already being worked on as early as 1935. To clear the space for the New Reich Chancellery, the buildings on the northern side of Voßstraße No. 2–10 had already been demolished in 1937.

Over 4,000 people worked in shifts, so that progress could be made around the clock. The immense construction was finished 48 hours ahead of schedule, and the project earned Speer a reputation as a good organiser, which played a part in the architect becoming Armaments Minister and a director of forced labour later in the war. Speer recalls that the whole work force — masons, carpenters, plumbers, etc. were invited to inspect the finished building. Hitler then addressed the workers in the Sportpalast; interior fittings, however, were not finished until the early 1940s. In the end, the project cost over 90 million Reichsmarks (equivalent to  million  €), and hosted the various ministries of the Reich.

In his memoirs, Speer described the impression of the Reichskanzlei on a visitor:

The series of rooms comprising the approach to Hitler's reception gallery were decorated with a rich variety of materials and colours, and totalled 221 m (725 ft) in length. The gallery itself was 147.5 m (484 ft) long. Hitler's own office was 400 square meters in size. From the outside, the chancellery had a stern, authoritarian appearance. From the Wilhelmplatz, guests would enter the Chancellery through the Court of Honour (Ehrenhof). The building's main entrance was flanked by two bronze statues by sculptor Arno Breker: "Wehrmacht" and "Die Partei" ("Armed Forces" and "The Party"). Hitler is said to have been greatly impressed by the building and was uncharacteristically free in his praise for Speer, lauding the architect as a "genius". The chancellor's great study was a particular favourite of the dictator. The big marble-topped table served as an important part of the Nazi leader's military headquarters, the study being used for military conferences from 1944 on. On the other hand, the Cabinet room was never used for its intended purpose.

The New Reich Chancellery suffered severe damage during the Battle of Berlin between April to May 1945 (in comparison, the Old Reich Chancellery was not as badly destroyed). Andrei Gromyko, who would later become the Soviet foreign minister, visited the partially-destroyed structure a few weeks after the fighting in the city had completely ceased. He recalls, "We reached it not without difficulties. Ruined edifices, formless heaps of metal and ferro-concrete encumbered the way. To the very entrance of the Chancellery, the car could not approach. We had to reach it on foot..." He noted the New Reich Chancellery "...was almost destroyed... Only the walls remained, riddled by countless shrapnel, yawning by big shot-holes from shells. Ceilings survived only partly. Windows loomed black by emptiness."

The last stage of defense by defending German troops took place inside the Reich Chancellery, as mentioned by Gromyko, who stated the following:

After World War II in Europe ended, the remains in what was then East Berlin (the Soviet-occupied sector of a divided Berlin) were demolished by the order of the Soviet occupation forces. Parts of the building's marble walls were rumoured to have been used in the building of the Soviet war memorial located in Treptower Park, or to renovate and repair the nearby war-damaged Mohrenstraße U-Bahn subway station. Petrographic analyses of materials used for construction there did not confirm those rumours. Some of the so-called "red marble" (actually limestone) obtained from the demolition of the New Reich Chancellery was also supposedly used in the construction of the Moscow Metro's palatial-style subway stations after the war. Also, it is alleged that a heater from one of Hitler's rooms was placed in a Protestant hospital located not too far away from the Reich Chancellery.

While the western half of the plot was used by the East German government for the establishment of the so-called "Death-Strip" adjacent to the Berlin Wall in 1961 (when the barrier was being constructed), a Plattenbau apartment block, together with a kindergarten, was built on the eastern half (along Wilhelmstraße) during the 1980s.

Gallery

See also 
 German Chancellery
 Nazi architecture
 Vorbunker
 Welthauptstadt Germania
 Berchtesgaden Chancellery Branch office ("Reichskanzlei Dienststelle Berchtesgaden")

References and citations

General 
 
 
 Allied Intelligence Map of Key Buildings in Berlin (Third Edition, 1945)

Further reading 

 
 
 
 
 
 
 
 
 
 Neubauer, Christoph (2014): Die Reichskanzlei – Architektur der Macht, Band 1 (1733–1875). Chr. Neubauer Verlag, Großschönau 2014, .

Documentary 
Ruins of the Reich DVD R.J. Adams  (Third Reich architecture ruins)
Hitlers Berlin 3D – Die Reichskanzlei Interaktiv DVD(Computer Animation of the Reich Chancellery).

External links 

 Photographs of the Reich Chancellery
 Animation of the Reich Chancellery
 3D-stereoscopic images of Chancellery
 Website of the German History Museum with photographs and information
 Photographs of the Reich Chancellery

Nazi architecture
Government buildings completed in 1938
Buildings and structures in Berlin
Demolished buildings and structures in Germany
20th century in Berlin
Government of Nazi Germany
World War II sites in Germany
Führer Headquarters
Buildings and structures in Germany destroyed during World War II
Former palaces in Germany